William Rivers Pitt (November 9, 1971 – September 26, 2022) was an American author, editor, and liberal political activist.

Background
William Rivers Pitt was born in Washington, D.C.; his father, Charles Redding Pitt, became chair of the Alabama State Democratic Party. He was educated in English literature at Holy Cross College, a Catholic college in Massachusetts. He taught English literature, journalism, grammar, and history at a small private school before joining the staff of the non-profit news organization Truthout.

Writing career

Pitt's book War on Iraq: What Team Bush Doesn't Want You to Know, with Scott Ritter, was published by Profile Books in 2002. It was an in-depth examination of the Bush administration's false WMD arguments set against testimony and data from a weapons inspector who oversaw the destruction of Iraq's stockpiles in the 1990s. In reviewing this book, The Guardian called it "the most comprehensive independent analysis of the state of knowledge about Iraq's weapons programmes until the new team of inspectors went back." In December of 2002, the book appeared on the New York Times best-seller list, was an international best-seller, and was translated into 13 languages. 

Pitt's book The Greatest Sedition Is Silence: Four Years in America," was published by Pluto Press in 2003. It is an analysis of U.S. politics in areas outside the push for war in Iraq, covering topics such as the Enron collapse, the media and Fox News, but primarily concentrates on the aftermath of the attacks of September 11.

Pitt also published Our Flag, Too: The Paradox of Patriotism with Context Books in 2003.

Pitt's book House of Ill Repute: Reflections on War, Lies, and America's Ravaged Reputation, was published by PoliPoint Press in 2006. It serves as a second volume to Pitt's first book by compiling the myriad ways the Bush administration lied the U.S. into an invasion of Iraq, and documents the steep cost in blood, treasure and reputation brought by the war. 

Pitt's book The Mass Destruction of Iraq: The Disintegration of a Nation: Why It Is Happening, and Who Is Responsible, was published by Truthout in 2014. The book was co-authored by Truthout reporter Dahr Jamail, who traveled to Iraq after "Shock and Awe" and spent months as an unembedded journalist reporting from Fallujah and other hot spots in the war. Pitt and Jamail combined to create a searing indictment of the war, and of those who championed it in Washington D.C. Mass Destruction is the last volume of Pitt's trilogy on the war.

Personal life
Pitt died on September 26, 2022.

References

1971 births
2022 deaths
American bloggers
American online publication editors
Writers from Washington, D.C.
Writers from Alabama
Writers from Massachusetts
21st-century American essayists